was a Japanese daimyō of the late Edo period.

The Makino were identified as one of the fudai or insider daimyō clans which were hereditary vassals or allies of the Tokugawa clan, in contrast with the tozama or outsider clans.

Makino clan genealogy
The fudai Makino clan originated in 16th century Mikawa Province. Their elevation in status by Toyotomi Hideyoshi dates from 1588.  They claim descent from Takechiuchi no Sukune, who was a legendary Statesman   and lover of the legendary Empress Jingū.

Tadakiyo was part of the senior branch of the Makino which was established at Tako Domain in Kōzuke Province in 1590.  In 1616, their holdings were moved to Nagamine Domain in Echigo Province.  From 1618 through 1868, this branch of the Makino remained at Nagaoka Domain (74,000 koku) in Echigo Province.
 
Tadakiyo was the 9th-generation head of the main line of the Makino.

The head of this clan line was ennobled as a "Viscount" in the Meiji period.

Tokugawa official
Tadakiyo served as the Tokugawa shogunate's thirty-second Kyoto shoshidai in the period spanning January 13, 1799, through August 19, 1801.

Notes

References
 Appert, Georges and H. Kinoshita. (1888).  Ancien Japon. Tokyo: Imprimerie Kokubunsha.
 Meyer, Eva-Maria. (1999).  Japan's Kaiserhof in de Edo-Zeit: Unter besonderer Berücksichtigung der Jahre 1846 bis 1867. Münster: Tagenbuch. 
 Papinot, Edmond. (1906) Dictionnaire d'histoire et de géographie du japon. Tokyo: Librarie Sansaisha...Click link for digitized 1906 Nobiliaire du japon (2003)
 Sasaki Suguru. (2002). Boshin sensō: haisha no Meiji ishin. Tokyo: Chūōkōron-shinsha.

External links
 National Archives of Japan  ... Nagaoka Castle (1644)

|-

Daimyo
Rōjū
Makino clan
Kyoto Shoshidai
1760 births
1831 deaths
People from Nagaoka Domain